Perovo is a rural locality (a village) in Demidovskoye Rural Settlement, Gus-Khrustalny District, Vladimir Oblast, Russia. The population was 328 as of 2010. There are 4 streets.

Geography 
Perovo is located 34 km southwest of Gus-Khrustalny (the district's administrative centre) by road. Chaslitsy is the nearest rural locality.

References 

Rural localities in Gus-Khrustalny District